John Pomeroy Townsend (1832–1898) was an American financier of the Gilded Age. He proudly claimed descent from "old Puritan stock", tracing his ancestry to a Thomas Townsend who settled at Lynn, Massachusetts in 1637.

Business career
Townsend was born in Middlebury, Vermont. He began his business career in New York City in 1850. He became Second Vice-President of the Bowery Savings Bank from 1875 to 1883, First Vice-President from 1883 to 1894, and President from 1894 to his death in 1898; he was also President of the Maritime Exchange from 1883 to 1888, Treasurer of the New York Produce Exchange in 1887, a member of the Chamber of Commerce, and from 1889 President of the Knickerbocker Trust Company. Other positions included president of the Municipal Gas-Light Company of Rochester; director of the Long Island Railroad Company; and secretary and manager of the Hospital for the Ruptured and Crippled.

Writings
Townsend was also a writer on economic matters, his publications including the chapters on U.S. Savings Banks in volume 2 of A History of Banking in all the Leading Nations (1896), as well as writings on the Free Silver controversy.

Death
On 10 September 1898, Townsend died suddenly of a heart attack shortly after dinner at his summer house in Tarrytown, New York.

References

1832 births
1898 deaths
American bankers
Businesspeople from New York City
People from Middlebury, Vermont
19th-century American businesspeople
American bank presidents
People from Tarrytown, New York
Businesspeople from Vermont
American people of English descent
Knickerbocker Trust Company